The Tausūg or Suluk, are an ethnic group of the Philippines and Malaysia. A small population can also be found in the northern part of North Kalimantan, Indonesia. The Tausūg are part of the wider political identity of Muslims of Mindanao, Sulu and Palawan. Most of the Tausūg have converted into the religion of Islam whose members are now more known as the Moro group, who constitute the third largest ethnic group of Mindanao, Sulu and Palawan. The Tausugs originally had an independent state known as the Sultanate of Sulu, which once exercised sovereignty over the present day provinces of Basilan, Palawan, Sulu, Tawi-Tawi, Zamboanga City, North Kalimantan and the eastern part of the Malaysian state of Sabah (formerly North Borneo).

Etymology
"Tausug" means "the people of the current", from the word tau which means "man" or "people" and sūg (alternatively spelled sulug or suluk) which means "[sea] currents". The term Tausūg was derived from two words tau and sūg (or suluk in Malay) meaning "people of the current", referring to their homelands in the Sulu Archipelago. Sūg and suluk both mean the same thing, with the former being the phonetic evolution in Sulu of the latter (the L being dropped and thus the two short U's merging into one long U). The Tausūg in Sabah refer to themselves as Tausūg but refers to their ethnic group as "Suluk" as documented in official documents such as birth certificates in Sabah, which are written in Malay.

History

Pre-Islamic era
During the 13th century the Tausug people began migrating to present-day Zamboanga and the Sulu archipelago from their homelands in northeastern Mindanao. Scott (1994) mentions the origins of the Tausugs as being the descendants of ancient Butuanons and Surigaonons from the Rajahnate of Butuan, who moved south and established a spice trading port in pre-Islamic Sulu. Sultan Batarah Shah Tengah, who ruled as sultan in 1600, was said to be an actual native of Butuan. The Butuanon-Surigaonon origins of the Tausugs is suggested by the relationship of their languages, as the Butuanon, Surigaonon and Tausug languages are all grouped under the Southern sub-family of Visayan. Subsequently, the Tausug language is closely related to other Southern Bisayan languages like the Butuanon language, which is still spoken in northeastern Mindanao to this day.

Prior to the establishment of the sultanate, the Tausug lived in communities called a banwa. Each banwa is headed by a leader known as a panglima along with a shaman called a mangungubat. The panglima is usually a man with a strong political and physical leadership among the community folks. The shaman may either be a man or a woman, and they are specialized in contacting the spiritual realm. The shamans are also exempted from practicing traditional marriage as they can have sensual relationships with the same sex, a common trait in numerous tribes throughout the Philippine archipelago and northern Borneo in pre-Islamic and pre-Christian times. Each banwa is considered as an independent state, the same with the city-states of other regions in Asia. The Tausug during the era had trade relations with other neighboring Tausug banwas, the Yakan of Basilan, and the nomadic Sama Bajau.

The Tausug became the dominant ethnic group in the Sulu archipelago, dominating over the local Sama-Bajau people, after they were Islamized in the 14th century and established the sultanate of Sulu in the 15th century.

Sultanate era

In 1380, Karim-ul Makhdum, a Muslim missionary, arrived in Sulu. He introduced the Islamic faith and settled in Tubig Indangan in  Simunul until his death. Still standing are pillars of a mosque he had built at Tubig-Indangan. In 1390, Rajah Baguinda Ali landed at Buansa, and extended the missionary work of Makhdum. The Johore-born Arab adventurer Sayyid Abubakar Abirin arrived in 1450, and married Baguinda's daughter, Dayang-dayang Paramisuli. After Rajah Baguinda's death, Sayyid Abubakar became sultan, thereby introducing the sultanate as a political system (the Sultanate of Sulu). Political districts were created in Parang, Pansul, Lati, Gitung, and Luuk, each headed by a panglima or district leader. After Sayyid Abubakar's death, the sultanate system had already become well established in Sulu. Before the coming of the Spaniards, the ethnic groups in Sulu — the Tausug, Samal, Yakan, and Bajau – were united in varying degrees under the Sulu sultanate.

The political system of the sultanate was patrilineal. The sultan was the sole sovereign of the sultanate, followed by various maharajah and rajah-titled subdivisional princes. Further down the line were the numerous panglima or local chiefs, similar in function to the modern Philippine political post of the barangay captain in the barangay system. Of significance are the sarip (sharif) and their wives, sharifah, who are Hashemite descendants of the Islamic prophet, Muhammad.

Battles and skirmishes were waged intermittently from 1578 till 1898 between the Spanish colonial government and the Moros of Mindanao and the Sulu archipelago. In 1578, an expedition sent by Governor Francisco de Sande and headed by Captain Rodriguez de Figueroa began the 300-year conflict between the Tausūgs and the Spanish authorities. In 1579, the Spanish government gave de Figueroa the sole right to colonize Mindanao. In retaliation, the Moro raided Visayan towns in Panay, Negros, and Cebu, for they knew the Spanish conscripted foot soldiers from these areas. Such Moro raids were repelled by Spanish and Visayan forces. In the early 17th century, the largest alliance, comprising Maranao, Maguindanao, Tausūg, and other Moro and Lumad groups, was formed by Sultan Kudarat or Cachil Corralat of Maguindanao, ruler of domains extending from the Davao Gulf to Dapitan on the Zamboanga peninsula. Several Spanish expeditions suffered defeat at their hands. In 1635, Captain Juan de Chaves erected a fort and established a settlement in Zamboanga. In 1637, Governor General Sebastián Hurtado de Corcuera personally led an expedition against Kudarat, and temporarily triumphed over his forces at Lamitan and Iliana Bay. On 1 January 1638, Hurtado de Corcuera, with 80 vessels and 2000 soldiers, defeated the Moro Tausūg and occupied Jolo, mainly staying inside captured Cottas. A peace treaty was forged, but Spanish sovereignty over Sulu still had not been firmly established; the Tausūg abrogated the treaty in 1646 soon after the Spaniards occupiers departed. It wasn't until 1705 that the sultanate renounced to Spain any sovereignty it had previously asserted over south Palawan, and in 1762 it similarly relinquished its claims over Basilan. During the last quarter of the 19th century the sultanate formally recognized Spanish sovereignty, but these areas remained partially controlled by the Spanish, with their sovereignty limited to military stations, garrisons, and pockets of civilian settlements in Zamboanga and Cotabato (the latter under the sultanate of Maguindanao). Eventually, as a consequence of their defeat in the Spanish–American War, the Spanish had to abandon the region entirely.

In 1737, Sultan Alimud Din I, advancing his own personal interests, entered into a "permanent" peace treaty with Governor General F. Valdes y Tamon; and in 1746, he befriended the Jesuits sent to Jolo by King Philip. The "permission" of Sultan Azimuddin-I (*the first heir-apparent) allowed Catholic Jesuits to enter Jolo, but his younger brother, Raja Muda Maharajah Adinda Datu Bantilan (*the second heir-apparent) argued against this, saying that he did not want the Catholic Jesuits to disturb or dishonor Islamic faith among the Moro in Sulu. The two brothers' disagreement eventually caused Sultan Azimuddin-I to depart Jolo, first removing to Zamboanga and eventually arriving in Manila 1748. Upon his departure, his brother Raja Muda Maharajah Adinda Datu Bantilan was proclaimed sultan, taking the name Sultan Bantilan Muizzuddin.

In 1893, amid succession controversies, Amir ul Kiram became Sultan Jamalul Kiram II, the title being officially recognized by the Spanish authorities. In 1899, after the defeat of Spain in the Spanish–American War, Colonel Luis Huerta, the last governor of Sulu, relinquished his garrison to the Americans. (Orosa 1970:25–30).

In northern Borneo, most citizen families residing in Sabah are generally-recognized to have lived in the area since the time of the sultanate. Local North Borneo records indicate that during the period of British rule, a notable Bajau-Suluk warrior participated in the Mat Salleh Rebellion, participating in the conflict until his death. During the Second World War when the Japanese occupied the northern Borneo area, many Suluk people, along with ethnic Chinese emigrants, were massacred by Japanese soldiers during the Jesselton Revolt against the Japanese invasion and occupation.

Modern era

Philippines

A "policy of attraction" was introduced, ushering in reforms to encourage Muslim integration into Philippine society. "Proxy colonialism" was legalised by the Public Land Act of 1919, invalidating Tausūg pusaka (inherited property) laws based on the Islamic Shariah. The act also granted the state the right to confer land ownership. It was thought that the Muslims would "learn" from the "more advanced" Christian Filipinos, and would integrate more easily into mainstream Philippine society. In February 1920, the Philippine Senate and House of Representatives passed Act No 2878, which abolished the Department of Mindanao and Sulu, and transferred its responsibilities to the Bureau of Non-Christian Tribes under the Department of the Interior. Muslim dissatisfaction grew as power shifted to the Christian Filipinos. Petitions were sent by Muslim leaders between 1921 and 1924, requesting that Mindanao and Sulu be administered directly by the United States. These petitions were not granted. Realising the futility of armed resistance, some Muslims sought to make the best of the situation. In 1934, Arolas Tulawi of Sulu, Datu Manandang Piang and Datu Blah Sinsuat of Cotabato, and Sultan Alaoya Alonto of Lanao were elected to the 1935 Constitutional Convention. In 1935, two Muslims were elected to the National Assembly.

The Tausūg in Sulu fought against the Japanese occupation of Mindanao and Sulu during World War II and eventually drove them out. The Commonwealth sought to end the privileges the Muslims had been enjoying under the earlier American administration. Muslim exemptions from some national laws, as expressed in the administrative code for Mindanao, and the Muslim right to use their traditional Islamic courts, as expressed in the Moro Board, were ended. It was unlikely that the Muslims, who have had a longer cultural history as Muslims than the Filipinos as Christians, would surrender their identity. This incident contributed to the rise of various separatist movements – the Muslim Independence Movement (MIM), Ansar El-Islam, and Union of Islamic Forces and Organizations (Che Man 1990:74–75). In 1969, the Moro National Liberation Front (MNLF) was founded on the concept of a Bangsa Moro Republic by a group of educated young Muslims. In 1976, negotiations between the Philippine government and the MNLF in Tripoli resulted in the Tripoli Agreement, which provided for an autonomous region in Mindanao. Nur Misuari was invited to chair the provisional government, but he refused. The referendum was boycotted by the Muslims themselves. The talks collapsed, and fighting continued. On 1 August 1989, Republic Act 673 or the Organic Act for Mindanao, created the Autonomous Region of Mindanao, which encompasses Maguindanao, Lanao del Sur, Sulu, and Tawi-Tawi.

Malaysia

Most of the Tausugs in Malaysia have lived since the rule of the sultanate of Sulu in parts of Sabah with some of them actually descendants of a Sulu princess (Dayang Dayang) who had escaped from the Sulu sultan in the 1850s when the sultan tried to take the princess as a wife although the sultan already have many concubines. To differentiate themselves from the newly arrived Tausūg immigrants from the Philippines, most of them prefer to be called "Suluk".

However, more recent Tausug immigrants and refugees dating back to the 1970s Moro insurgency (the majority of them illegal immigrants) often face discrimination in Sabah. After the 2013 Lahad Datu standoff, there were reports of abuses by Malaysian authorities specifically on ethnic Tausug during crackdowns in Sandakan, even on Tausūg migrants with valid papers. Approximately nine thousand Filipino Tausūg were deported from January to November 2013.

Demographics

The Tausug number 1,226,601 in the Philippines in 2010. They populate the Filipino province of Sulu as a majority, and the provinces of Zamboanga del Sur, Basilan, Tawi-Tawi, Palawan, Cebu and Manila as minorities. Many Filipino-Tausūgs have found work in neighbouring Sabah, Malaysia as construction labourers in search of better lives. However, many of them  violate the law by overstaying illegally and are sometimes involved in criminal activities. The Filipino-Tausūgs are not recognised as a native to Sabah.

The native Tausugs who have lived since the Sulu sultanate era in Sabah have settled in much of the eastern parts, from Kudat town in the north, to Tawau in the south east. They number around 300,000 and many of them have intermarried with other ethnic groups in Sabah, especially the Bajaus. Most prefer to use the Malay-language ethnonym Suluk in their birth certificates rather than the native Tausūg to distinguish themselves from their newly arrived Filipino relatives in Sabah. Migration fueled mainly from Sabah also created a substantial Suluk community in Greater Kuala Lumpur. While in Indonesia, most of the communities mainly settled in the northern area of North Kalimantan like Nunukan and Tarakan, which lies close to their traditional realm. There are around 12,000 (1981 estimate) Tausūg in Indonesia.

Religion
The overwhelming majority of Tausūgs follow Islam, as Islam has been a defining aspect of native Sulu culture ever since Islam spread to the southern Philippines. They follow the traditional Sunni Shafi'i section of Islam, however they retain pre-Islamic religious practices and often practice a mix of Islam and Animism in their adat. A Christian minority exists. During the Spanish occupation, the presence of Jesuit missionaries in the Sulu Archipelago allowed for the conversion of entire families and even tribes and clans of Tausūgs, and other Sulu natives to Roman Catholicism. For example, Azim ud-Din I of Sulu, the 19th sultan of Sulu was converted to Roman Catholicism and baptised as Don Fernando de Alimuddin, however he reverted to Islam in his later life near death.

Some of the assimilated Filipino celebrities and politicians of Tausūg descent also tend to follow the Christian religion of the majority instead of the religion of their ancestors. For example, Maria Lourdes Sereno, the 24th Chief Justice of the Supreme Court of the Philippines is of patrilineal Tausūg descent is a born-again Christian. Singer Sitti is of Tausūg and Samal descent (she claims to be of Mapun heritage, also native to Sulu), is also a Christian.

Traditional Political Structure
The political structure of the Tausug is affected by the two economic divisions in the ethnic group, mainly parianon (people of the landing) and guimbahanon (hill people). Before the establishment of the sultanate of Sulu, the indigenous pre-Islamic Tausug were organized into various independent communities or community-states called banwa. When Islam arrived and the sultanate was established, the banwa was divided into districts administered by a panglima (mayor). The panglima are under the sultan (king). The people who held the stability of the community along with the sultan and the panglimas are the ruma bichura (state council advisers), datu raja muda (crown prince), datu maharaja adensuk (palace commander), datu ladladja laut (admiral), datu maharaja layla (commissioner of customs), datu amir bahar (speaker of the ruma bichara), datu tumagong (executive secretary), datu juhan (secretary of information), datu muluk bandarasa (secretary of commerce), datu sawajaan (secretary of interior), datu bandahala (secretary of finance), mamaneho (inspector general), datu sakandal (sultan's personal envoy), datu nay (ordinance or weapon commander), wazil (prime minister). A mangungubat (curer) also has special status in the community as they are believed to have direct contact with the spiritual realm.

The community's people is divided into three classes, which are the nobility (the sultan's family and court), commoners (the free people), and the slaves (war captives, sold into slavery, or children of slaves).

Languages

The Tausug language is called "Sinug" with "Bahasa" to mean Language. The Tausug language is related to Bicolano, Tagalog and Visayan languages, being especially closely related to the Surigaonon language of the provinces Surigao del Norte, Surigao del Sur and Agusan del Sur and the Butuanon language of northeastern Mindanao specially the root Tausug words without the influence of the Arabic language, sharing many common words. The Tausūg, however, do not consider themselves as Visayan, using the term only to refer to Christian Bisaya-language speakers, given that the vast majority of Tausūgs are Muslims in contrast to its very closely related Surigaonon brothers which are predominantly Roman Catholics. Tausug is also related to the Waray-Waray language. Aside from Tagalog (which is spoken throughout the country), a number of Tausug can also speak Zamboangueño Chavacano (especially those residing in Zamboanga City), and other Visayan languages (especially Cebuano language because of the mass influx of Cebuano migrants to Mindanao); Malay in the Philippines, Malaysia and Indonesia; and English in both Malaysia and Philippines as second languages.

Malaysian Tausūg, descendants of residents when the Sulu sultanate ruled the eastern part of Sabah, speak or understand the Sabahan dialect of Suluk, Malaysian language, and some English or Simunul. Those who come in regular contact with the Bajau also speak Bajau dialects. By the year 2000, most of the Tausūg children in Sabah, especially in towns of the west side of Sabah, were no longer speaking Tausūg; instead they speak the Sabahan dialect of Malay and English.

Cultures
Tausūgs are superb warriors and craftsmen. They are known for the Pangalay dance (also known as Daling-Daling in Sabah), in which female dancers wear artificial elongated fingernails made from brass or silver known as janggay, and perform motions based on the Vidhyadhari (Bahasa Sūg: Bidadali) of pre-Islamic Buddhist legend. The Tausug are also well known for their pis syabit, a multi-colored woven cloth traditionally worn as a headress or accessory by men. Nowadays, the pis syabit is also worn by women and students. In 2011, the pis syabit was cited by the National Commission for Culture and the Arts as one of the intangible cultural heritage of the Philippines under the traditional craftsmanship category that the government may nominate in the UNESCO Intangible Cultural Heritage Lists. The Tausug are additionally associated with tagonggo, a traditional type of kulingtang music.

Notable Tausūgs

 Santanina T. Rasul, first Filipino Muslim woman senator.
 Muedzul Lail Tan Kiram, legitimate sultan of Sulu Filipino 
 Nur Misuari, former Filipino governor and founder of the Moro National Liberation Front.
 Hadji Kamlon, freedom fighter
 Jamalul Kiram III, self-proclaimed Filipino sultan.
 Ismael Kiram II, self-proclaimed Filipino sultan.
 Mat Salleh (Datu Muhammad Salleh), Sabah warrior from Inanam who led the Mat Salleh Rebellion until his death.
 Tun Datu Mustapha (Tun Datu Mustapha bin Datu Harun), first Yang di-Pertua Negeri (Governor) of Sabah and third Chief Minister of Sabah.
 Juhar Mahiruddin, tenth Yang di-Pertua Negeri (Governor) of Sabah (also partial Kadazan-Dusun ethnic ancestry).
 Musa Aman, fourteenth Chief Minister of Sabah.
 Shafie Apdal, fifteenth Chief Minister of Sabah.
 Sitti, Filipino singer.
 Abdusakur Mahail Tan, Governor of Sulu. 
 Maria Lourdes Sereno, 24th Chief Justice of the Supreme Court of the Philippines.
Darhata Sawabi, Filipino weaver known for pis syabit, a traditional Tausūg cloth tapestry. She is a recipient of the Philippine National Living Treasures Award.
 Wawa Zainal Abidin, Malaysian actress.
 Yong Muhajil, YouTube vlogger and 3rd runner up in Pinoy Big Brother: Lucky 7.
 Nelson Dino, novelist, author, short story, prose and poetry writer,  a recipient of Sabah Literary Prize 2016–2017 (Hadiah Sastera Sabah 2016–2017) and ASEAN 2 Poetry Competition 100 Best Works.  His books are Sulug in Sabah,  Pengikat Kasih, Bisikan Bumi, Kita Punya Cara,  Sapi Mandangan dan Apuk Daguan,  and PIS: Pemikiran dan Identiti Suluk.
Omar Musa, an award-winning author, poet and rapper from Queanbeyan, New South Wales, Australia. He has released three solo hip hop records (including Since Ali Died) and three books of poetry. His debut novel Here Come the Dogs was published in 2014. Here Come the Dogs was long-listed for the Miles Franklin Award. He was named one of the Sydney Morning Herald’s Young Novelists of the Year in 2015. He is the son of Australian arts journalist Helen Musa and Malaysian poet Musa bin Masran. He is of Suluk, Kedayan and Irish ancestry. He studied at the Australian National University and the University of California, Santa Cruz.
 Dr. Benj Bangahan, Doc Benj, as he is fondly called, is a doctor, writer, philanthropist, event organizer, historian, and a lot more. He is better known as an expert in the Tausug language.  However, overarching all these is his identity as a proud Tausug, one who loves his homeland, treasures his culture, and dreams and hopes of a progressive tomorrow for all Tausugs.
Aziz Kong, a Tausug of Chinese origin from Siasi, and a Tausug vlogger based in Abu Dhabi, who publish vlogs, educational and medical videos in Bahasa Tausug under the YouTube channel name: Amanat hi Akong Kong which means " The message of Akong Kong".
Abed Azel Yusop, professional Dota 2 player.
 Mohd Fazil Bin Ajak, activist and researcher. Born in Duchess of Kent Hospital, Sandakan on February 3, 1988. The family is Suluk Tambisan (located in Lahad Datu) Organized few events related of Suluk for instance Seminar Sejarah Keagungan Suluk Sabah I & II, Simposium Sejarah Keagungan Suluk Sabah, UPSI, 2011 officiated  by Governor of Sabah Tun Juhar Datuk Haji Mahiruddin. Published books of Menjana Transformasi Etnik Suluk, Pemikiran & Identiti Suluk (PIS) etc. He is a master holder in education, his research using the Textdealism Theory by Mana Sikana and Suluk folk song Daling-Daling. In society, he also vice president for Professional Suluk Sabah (PROSS) Association, Perdana Fellow Alumni Association (PFAA), etc. In politic, he was a UMNO member of Libaran since 2006, and joined PPBM in 2019 before selected as a young candidate in LDP for Sabah election in September,2020.

See also
Tausug language

Sulu achipelago

 Sulu (province)

Sultanate of Sulu

Ethnic groups in the Philippines

 Moro peoples of the Philippines
 Sulu:
 Yakan people
 Bajau people

 Mindanao:
 Maranao people
 Iranun people
 Maguindanao people
 Visayan peoples
 Butuanon people
 Surigaonon people

Notes

References

External links 
 Tausūg at Encyclopædia Britannica

North Kalimantan
Ethnic groups in Indonesia
Muslim communities of Indonesia
Ethnic groups in Sabah
Ethnic groups in Mindanao
Ethnic groups in Palawan
Muslim communities of the Philippines
Suluk people
Moro ethnic groups
Islam in the Philippines